Sary-Kamysh is a village in the Kadamjay District, Batken Region of Kyrgyzstan. Its population was 6 in 2021.

References

Populated places in Batken Region